Prague Together is an association of independent candidates in Prague. It was created for the 2018 Prague municipal election by KDU-ČSL MP Jan Čižinský. The main representatives are Jan Čižinský and Hana Třeštíková. It was created on the basis of a similar initiative , which in 2014 won the elections to the municipal council of the Prague 7 district. The association is made up of active citizens, tries to connect with local associations and "to present itself as a principled alternative to the existing municipal establishment with the aim of winning the elections." For the 2022 Prague municipal election it was turned into a political party.

History
On 12 December 2017, the group announced that it intended to collect 100,000 signatures, which would allow it to run as an association of independent candidates under the Act on Municipal Council Elections. The motto of the petition was "A Prague that you can sign up for" (.)

Prague Together eventually collected 97,095 signatures and launched its campaign for the 2018 Prague municipal election based on volunteers. Prague Together received 16.57% of votes finishing third. The movement then became part of the governing coalition in Prague.

Prague Together tried to collect 100,000 signatures for the 2022 Prague municipal election but failed having gathered only 92,565 signatures and thus ran as a political party. The party finished 4th, with 14.73% of the vote.

Election results

Prague municipal elections

References

Politics of Prague
Liberal parties in the Czech Republic
Political parties in the Czech Republic
Political parties established in 2017
KDU-ČSL breakaway groups
2017 establishments in the Czech Republic